Bowie is an unincorporated community and a census-designated place in Cochise County, Arizona, United States.  As of the 2010 U.S. Census the population of Bowie was 449.

History
The Southern Pacific built a rail line through eastern Arizona in 1880, including a stop at Bowie.  Once a junction was made in March 1881 with eastern rail lines in Deming, New Mexico, this line was the second transcontinental rail route across the United States.

The community is named for the former Fort Bowie.

Demographics

Bowie first appeared on the 1910 U.S. Census as the "Bowie Precinct" of Cochise County. It appeared again in 1920 and 1930 as a precinct. It reported a majority White population in 1930. The population of Bowie was 650 in the 1960 census. 2010, when it was made a census-designated place (CDP).

Location and nearby communities
The community lies on Interstate 10 in eastern Arizona close to the western New Mexico border. The community is in the west of the San Simon Valley, as well as the northeast foothills of the Dos Cabezas Mountains. On Interstate 10, Willcox, Arizona at the Willcox Playa lies west-southwest; San Simon, AZ and Road Forks-Lordsburg, New Mexico lie east.

Information
Bowie has the ZIP Code of 85605; in 2010, the population of the 85605 ZCTA was 449.

In popular culture
Bowie, Arizona gained attention when it was revealed that it was action icon John Rambo's hometown. This was first unveiled in Rambo: First Blood Part II and later elaborated on in Rambo III. In the film Rambo from 2008, Bowie was seen on screen for the first time, although the filming of that particular scene was actually done in Southern California. 2019's Rambo: Last Blood took place entirely in Bowie and Mexico, though filming was not done in Arizona.

Climate
Bowie has a borderline semi-arid/desert climate (Köppen BSk/BWk/BSh/BWh) with very hot summers punctuated by monsoon rains, and mild, generally dry winters with cold nights. In the winter, there are typically 63.6 nights falling below freezing, with the all-time record low being  on December 9, 1978 – though the dryness means only one day every three or four winters will fail to top freezing, and only 6.4 days per winter will not top .

References

Unincorporated communities in Cochise County, Arizona
Unincorporated communities in Arizona